Padovano is an Italian surname meaning "Paduan", "of Padua" or "from Padua". Notable people with the surname include:

Annibale Padovano (1527–1575), Italian composer and organist
Antonello Padovano, Italian film director and producer
Domenico Padovano (1940–2019), Italian Roman Catholic bishop
Melinda Padovano (born 1987), American professional wrestler
Michele Padovano (born 1966), Italian footballer

Italian-language surnames
Toponymic surnames